Superland is an amusement park in Rishon LeZion, Israel.

Superland opened to the public in 1991 and is one of the main amusement parks in Israel, along with Luna Park in Tel Aviv, My Baby in Yarka Zapari Birds park in Tel Aviv.

There has been recent controversy over an alleged policy of separating days when Jewish vs. Arab schools could have trips to the facility.  Superland claims this was done at the request of the schools themselves (on both the Jewish and Arab sides) but both Israeli Jews and Israeli Arabs 
have criticized that the park should have rejected such requests.

Attractions

Roller coasters

Flat rides

Former attractions

External links

  Official website

References

Amusement parks in Israel
Rishon LeZion
1991 establishments in Israel
Buildings and structures in Central District (Israel)
Tourist attractions in Central District (Israel)
Amusement parks opened in 1991